Odisha State Road Transport Corporation or OSRTC is the state owned road transport corporation in the eastern Indian state of Odisha. It is acknowledged for its distinguished service for safe and lowest cost of operation with a fleet of 636 buses.

History
The Odisha State Road Transport Corporation (OSRTC) established under the Orissa State Road Transport Corporation Act (1950), commenced its business of passenger transport services from 15 May 1974. In 1948, the Government of Odisha took over operation of bus services run by erstwhile princely states under State Transport Services (STS) of the Transport Department.

In 1950, the Central Act, R.T.C. Act (Act No. 64 of 1950) was enacted, which required creation of Road Transport Corporations under respective state governments. OSRTC was created w.e.f. 15 May 1974 and the assets and employees of State Transport Services were transferred to OSRTC. The corporation started functioning with Share Capital Contribution from the Government of Odisha and the Government of India in the ratio of 2:1. The O. R. T. Company, operating mostly in the southern parts of the state merged with the OSRTC in 1990 along with all its assets, liabilities and employees.

Services

Fleet

AC Deluxe (Ashok Leyland, Tata)
Express (Ashok Leyland)
Hi-Comfort (Ashok Leyland)
Hi-Tech (Ashok Leyland)
Light Commercial Vehicle
Volvo

Divisions
Odisha State Road Transport Corporation (OSRTC) has three divisions comprising a total of 23 depots.
Bhubaneswar Division
Berhampur Division
Sambalpur Division

Depots

Accolades

Apart from all these accolades, the success story of OSRTC has been included in the syllabus of Indian Institute of Management Ahmedabad as a case study.

References

External links

Transport companies established in 1974
Transport in Odisha
State agencies of Odisha
State road transport corporations of India
Companies based in Bhubaneswar
1974 establishments in Orissa